Rosenfelder Creek is a stream in the U.S. state of Missouri. It is a tributary to Smith Creek.

Rosenfelder Creek was named after Agnes Rosenfelder, an early settler.

References

Rivers of Missouri
Rivers of St. Louis County, Missouri